Gulkani is a village in Jind district, Haryana, India,  from the state capital of Chandigarh and  from Delhi.

Gulkani is situated on the Hisar-Jind highway (National Highway 9). Its postal address is VPO Gulkani, 126102, Jind. The nearest airport is Indira Gandhi International Airport in Delhi.

Villages in Jind district